The Chhimba Darzi are a  Muslim community, found in the Punjab region of Pakistan and India. Darzi means tailor in Urdu and Hindi. They are also known as Idrisi or Rajput. They are commonly very skillful persons. They belonged to Rajput karan and Raja Dahar’s ancestors. They also have a diaspora in Europe. They now work in a range of occupations but their ancestors' usual work was with clothing and hand-printed textiles. 

A significant number of Chhimba Darzi are now found in the city of Manchester in the United Kingdom.

See also
 Shaikhs in South Asia

References

Punjabi tribes